The Federación Nacional de Muchachas Guías de Nicaragua (National Federation of Girl Guides of Nicaragua) is the national Guiding organization of Nicaragua. It serves 86 members (as of 2003). Founded in 1940, the girls-only organization became an associate member of the World Association of Girl Guides and Girl Scouts in 1981.

The Guide Motto is Siempre Activas, Always Active; and the Guide Slogan is Lealtad Sacrificio Pureza, Loyalty Sacrifice Purity.

See also
 Asociación de Scouts de Nicaragua

References

World Association of Girl Guides and Girl Scouts member organizations
Scouting and Guiding in Nicaragua
Youth organizations established in 1940